Tali may refer to:

Places 
 Alternate spelling of Dali, city in China
 Tali, Estonia, village in Saarde Parish, Pärnu County, Estonia
 Tali, Helsinki, Finland
 Tali, township, part of Kozhikode, Kerala, India
 Tali, Arunachal Pradesh, place in Arunachal Pradesh State of India 
 Tali, Mazandaran or Taleh, village in Mazandaran Province, Iran
 Tali, West Azerbaijan or Tuli, village in West Azerbaijan Province, Iran
 Tali, Finnish name for Paltsevo, Leningrad Oblast, Russia. Location of Battle of Tali-Ihantala
 Taleex, also known as Tali or Taleh, small town in northeast Somalia
Tali County, area of Terekeka State, South Sudan
 Tali, town in South Sudan

Other uses
 Another name for the Dalbergia sissoo rosewood tree
 A normal beat indicating the beginning of a subdivision in the taal rhythmic cycle
 MC Tali, a drum and bass artist
 Knucklebones used for dice in Ancient Rome
 Plural of talus, a bone of the foot that articulates with the tibia and fibula

People with the surname
Anu Tali (born 1972), Estonian conductor, twin sister of Kadri
Jason Tali (born 1987), Papua New Guinean rugby league player
Kadri Tali (born 1972), Estonian conductor, twin sister of Anu
Kadri Tali (botanist) (born 1966), Estonian botanist to whom the standard botanical abbreviation Tali refers
Peeter Tali (born 1964), Estonian military person and journalist
T. Tali (c. 1943 – 2020), Indian politician from Nagaland
Urmas Tali (born 1970), Estonian volleyball player and coach

People with the given name
Tali is a feminine name derived from the Hebrew for "my lamb" (טלה) or "dew" (טל).  People called Tali include:
 Tali Darsigny (born 1998), Canadian weightlifter
 Tali Shalom Ezer (born 1978), Israeli filmmaker, writer, and director
 Tali Fahima (born 1976), Israeli pro-Palestinian activist
Tali Farhadian, Iranian-born American former federal prosecutor 
 Tali Goya (born 1990), Dominican rapper
 Tali Lennox (born 1993), British model, artist and actress
 Tali Mendelberg (born 1964), American political scientist
 Tali Moreno (born 1981), Israeli news presenter and reporter
 Tali Tali Pompey (1940s – 2011), Australian Aboriginal artist 
 Tali Sharot, cognitive neuroscientist
 Tali'Zorah, a character in the Mass Effect series

See also

Estonian-language surnames